Altai Seidırūly Kölgınov (born 15 January 1978) is a Kazakh politician. Held the position of Mayor of Astana from 2019 to 2022. Appointed Deputy Prime Minister of Kazakhstan from December 2022.

Early life and career
Kölginov was born in 1978, in the village of Abai in the Chimkent Oblast into a large Muslim family. He is the son of Seid Kölginov.  In 2000, he served in the army. 

In 2001, he worked as the chief specialist, acting in the personnel department of the Central Office of the Public Prosecutor.
From 2002 to 2003, he was the prosecutor of the department for the Formation of Legal Statistics of the Committee on Legal Statistics and Special Records of the Prosecutor General's Office. In 2003, Kölginov became the Deputy Head of the Agency for Civil Service Affairs in Astana. From 2007, he was the head of the Department for Analysis and Development of By-Laws of the Ministry of Justice until 2008, when Kölginov became the deputy general director of Alash Media Group LLP. From 2010 to 2012, he worked as a state inspector of the department of state control and organizational and territorial work of the Presidential Administration.

Early political career 
From 8 February 2012 to 4 April 2013, Kölginov was the deputy äkim of the West Kazakhstan Region until he was appointed as an äkim of Oral in which he served that position until 26 March 2016, when he became the West Kazakhstan Regional äkim.

Akim of Astana (2019-present) 
On 13 June 2019, Kölginov was appointed as Äkim of Astana (then Nur-sultan) by Kassym-Jomart Tokayev. Just days after assuming the role, Kölginov met with interest holders and promised to monitor the construction of their houses, by meeting with equity holders of one or two problematic LCDs every week. In response to the issues with the storm sewers rising sharply during the period of autumn rains and spring floods. Kölginov promised to solve this problem within two years. He stated that specialists will reconstruct drainage systems and build new collectors.

On 28 July 2019, Kölginov instructed to clear the mud-filled Sarybulaq River to which he called it an “environmental disaster” from the silt and bring it back to normal.

On 28 August 2019, he addressed the problems of the outskirts of the city, stating that around 280,000 people living do no have adequate access to running water. The cost for improving the area was amount to 275 billion tenge, to which Kölginov admitted that the spending cost for the improvements in the outskirts is not feasible in one year.

On 20 September 2019, at the Äkimat briefing, facing the demands by picketing mothers of many children for apartments by the state, including for those who are not standing in line, Kölginov offered the mothers jobs and housing in the North Kazakhstan Region and Ekibastuz; however, many refused and asked for apartments in Nur-Sultan. Kölginov, in response to the demands, stated that this “was wrong and not according to the law”.

References

1978 births
Living people
People from Turkistan Region
Kazakhstani politicians